Melanie Becker was a physicist known for her research into string theory. She was a tenured professor of physics at Texas A&M University upon her death in 2020.

Education 
Becker was originally from Germany and grew up in Malaga. She graduated from Instituto Nacional de Enseñanza Mixto de Torremolinos in 1987. She received her Diplom from the University of Bonn in 1991 working with Werner Nahm. She then worked with Luis Álvarez-Gaumé at the particle accelerator at CERN. Following her Ph.D. she was in California first as a postdoctoral fellow at the University of California, Santa Barbara and then at the California Institute of Technology as a research fellow working with John H. Schwarz. In 2000 she moved to the University of Maryland as an assistant professor, and then in 2005 she moved to Texas A&M University in 2005 where she became a tenured professor in the physics department.

Work 
Becker's research centered on the study of gravity and similar theories, with a particulate interest in string theory, M-theory, and quantum gravity. Becker's work included developing models for superstring compactification and, working with her sister , she developed one for the Kaluza–Klein theory.

In 2006 Becker, her sister Katrin, and John Schwartz published a graduate-level textbook on string theory and M-theory.

Selected publications

Awards and honors 
In 2001 Becker received a fellowship from the Alfred P. Sloan Foundation. In 2005 she received the Edward, Frances and Shirley B. Daniels fellowship from the Harvard Radcliffe Institute.

Personal life
Becker and her younger sister Katrin Becker were recruited to Texas A&M in 2005. Melanie Becker died on March 13, 2020.

References 

2020 deaths
University of Bonn alumni
Texas A&M University faculty
String theorists
Women physicists